Bad Ischl Friedhof is the town cemetery of Bad Ischl in Austria. It is on the State of Upper Austria's list of protected historical sites. 

In 1719 it was moved to its present location on Grazer Straße where it is laid out on land behind the Sebastiankapelle. The Sebastiankapelle (Saint Sebastian's chapel) was built in 1692 by Johann Lidl von Lidlsheim in gratitude to Saint Sebastian for his family's  escape from the plague. Johann Lidle and his second wife are thought to be buried beneath its altar. Later members of the family are buried in the Friedhof. Like the cemetery behind it, the chapel is on the list of protected historical sites in Upper Austria. 
 
There are many notable burials in the cemetery, including the writer Hilde Spiel, who once called it "the most beautiful place in the world."

Notable burials

People buried in the Bad Ischl Friedhof include:
 Karl Andreas Bernbrunn (1787–1854), actor and theatre director
 Rudi Gfaller (1882–1972), composer
 Leopold Hasner von Artha (1818–1891), Austrian statesman
 Heinrich Lammasch (1853–1920), jurist and the last Minister-President of Austria
 Franz Lehár (1870–1948), composer
 Stefan Meyer (1872–1949), physicist 
 Leo Perutz (1882–1957), writer
 Hilde Spiel (1911–1990), writer
 Oscar Straus (1870–1954), composer
 Spas Wenkoff (1928–2013), opera singer 
 Therese Wiet (1885–1971), operetta singer

There is also a memorial near the grave of Franz Lehár for the Austrian tenor Richard Tauber (1891–1948) who is buried in London.

References

External links
 
 

Buildings and structures in Upper Austria
Cemeteries in Austria
Tourist attractions in Upper Austria